Alexey Ivanovich Nagayev (March 17, 1704, Sertyakino-January 8, 1781, Saint Petersburg) was a Russian hydrographer, cartographer and an admiral.

Biography
Born in a family of the lesser nobility, he graduated from the Saint Petersburg Naval Academy and later found employment there. During the Seven Years' War Nagayev headed the hydrographic expedition to the Prussian shores. He also compiled the first atlases of the Bering Sea and Baltic Sea, which were published in 1752. Despite the absence of a meridian grid, Nagayev's maps were used for a further fifty years. In 1764-65 Nagayev became the supreme commander of the Kronstadt port. He was promoted to the rank of admiral in 1769.

Honours
A bay in the Okhotsk Sea is named after him.
Order of Saint Alexander Nevsky
Order of Saint Anna

See also
 Russian Hydrographic Service

References
 Great Soviet Encyclopedia (1974), vol. 17, p. 196
 Сухарева, О.В. Кто был кто в России от Петра I до Павла I'', Москва, 2005

Imperial Russian Navy admirals
Cartographers from the Russian Empire
Russian hydrographers
1704 births
1781 deaths
18th-century people from the Russian Empire